Germany's Next Topmodel, cycle 16 is the sixteenth cycle of Germany's Next Topmodel. It aired on ProSieben in February to May 2021. There is again no jury for this season, each episode has one or more guest judges.

The prizes include a cover and spread in the German edition of Harper's Bazaar, a €100,000 cash prize, and an Opel Mokka.

The winner of this season was 23-year-old  
Alex-Mariah Peter from Cologne, who is notably the first trans woman to win Germany's Next Topmodel.

Due to the COVID-19 epidemic, the season was filmed under strict COVID-19 regulations like travel restrictions. As a result, the sixteenth season was the first  and only season to be filmed entirely in Germany.

Contestants 
Ages stated are as of the beginning of the contest

Episode summaries

Episode 1: High Fashion in Berlin 
Original airdate: 
 
The new season starts with the arrival of the 31 finalists of Germany's Next Topmodel 2021 in Berlin, Germany. Host Heidi Klum immediately to move on in the hopes of becoming Germany's Next Top Model. This time they start with a Runway Show wearing dresses of designer Thierry Mugler. In the seasons before, Heidi selected out of the semifinalist the final cast after a runway show, but for this season the final cast to prove in a runway show as the first mission. Heidi takes 25 girls to the next round and let them move into a model loft.

Eliminated: Alexandra Reinke, Franziska Bergander, Lena Schreiber, Maria-Sophie Damiano, Samantha-Vanessa Herbst & Vanessa Gros
Special guests: Thierry Mugler

Episode 2: Willkommen im Modelloft! 
Original airdate: 

The girls moved in to their loft in Berlin. After that, Ricarda decided to quit the competition. Later that day, the girls had a catwalk training with host Heidi Klum. On the next day, the girls had their very first photoshoot. The girls did a promo shoot in groups of six plus opening credits with Heidi Klum. At elimination, the girls had a fashion show wearing Marina Hoermanseder gowns. Larissa and Maria landed in the bottom two. In the end, Maria was eliminated.

Quit: Ricarda Häschke
Bottom two: Larissa Onac & Maria Schimanski 
Eliminated: Maria Schimanski 
Featured photographer: Rankin 
Special guests: Marina Hoermanseder & Rankin

Episode 3: Primaballerina 
Original airdate: 

The week started with a ballet training for the girls. On the next day, the girls had their second big photoshoot in Berlin. Before the shoot, Sara decided to quit the competition. The girls had to shoot in pairs while portraying ballet dancers. Alex, Alysha, Amina, Ashley, Chanel, Elisa, Larissa, Linda, Luca, Romy and Soulin were the best in their pair and won immunity for the next elimination. At elimination, the remaining eleven girls had to battle it out on the catwalk. In the end, Nana was eliminated.

Quit: Sara Ullmann
Immune: Alex-Mariah Peter, Alysha Hübner, Amina Hotait, Ashley Amegan, Chanel Silberberg, Elisa Schattenberg, Larissa Onac, Linda Braunberger, Luca Vanak, Romy Wolf & Soulin Omar
Eliminated: Nana Fofana
Featured photographer: Markus Schäfer
Special guests: Nikeata Thompson

Episode 4: Fashion Divas und Roller Girls 
Original airdate: 

The week started with a roller skating training for the girls. On the next day, the girls had their next big photoshoot in Berlin. The girls had to shoot in front of a hotel, posing with dogs and portraying a luxurious woman. At elimination, the girls had to walk nude while being covered being in foam. Before the catwalk, Mira decided to quit the competition. In the end, Sarah was eliminated.

Quit: Mira Folster 
Eliminated: Sarah Ahrend
Featured photographer: Ellen von Unwerth
Special guests: Ellen von Unwerth & Oumi Janta

Episode 5: Das große #GNTM-Umstyling! 
Original airdate: 

The week started with the big makeover. At elimination, the girls had to walk in a fashion show in Christian Cowans gowns while posing at the end of the runway for a photoshoot. In the end, Amina was eliminated.Eliminated: Amina HotaitFeatured photographer: Mato JohannikSpecial guests: Christian Cowan

 Episode 6: Sedcard-Shooting 
Original airdate: 

The week started with a winter wonderland inspired runway show. On the next day, Dascha, Liliana, Romina and Soulin were invited to a casting for Levi's, and Soulin was booked for the job. Later on, the girls had their sedcard photoshoot. At elimination, Alysha, Ana, Ashley, Dascha, Elisa, Luca, Romy and Soulin were immune from elimination. Jasmine, Liliana, Linda and Miriam landed in the bottom four. In the end, Miriam was eliminated.Booked for job: Soulin OmarImmune: Alysha Hübner, Ana Martinovic, Ashley Amegan, Dascha Carriero, Elisa Schattenberg, Luca Vanak, Romy Wolf & Soulin Omar Bottom four: Jasmine Jüttner, Liliana Maxwell, Linda Braunberger & Miriam RautertEliminated: Miriam RautertFeatured photographer / special guest: Christian Anwander

 Episode 7: Back to the 80's!
Original airdate: 

The week started with a video shoot. The girls each had to create an 80's themed TV spot while posing as gymnasts and selling a product. At elimination, Ashley, Chanel and Mareike landed in the bottom three. In the end, Chanel was eliminated.Bottom three: Ashley Amegan, Chanel Silberberg & Mareike MüllerEliminated: Chanel SilberbergFeatured director: David HelmutSpecial guests: Christian Düren, Stefanie Giesinger & Marcus Butler

 Episode 8: Strike A Pose! 
Original airdate: 

The week started with a photoshoot. The girls had to pose in groups of four in a huge, rotating cube. Before the shoot, Jasmine decided to quit the competition due to health problems. At elimination, the girls had to showcase a sexy dance routine on high heels. In the end, Alysha was eliminated.Quit: Jasmine JüttnerEliminated: Alysha HübnerFeatured photographer: Pamela Hanson Special guests: Valentina Sampaio

 Episode 9: And Action! 
Original airdate: 

The week started with another big photoshoot. The girls had to pose as fairies at a height of 122 meters. After the photoshoot, Linda was eliminated, because she couldn't overcome her fear of heights. At elimination, Luca and Mareike landed in the bottom two. In the end, Mareike was eliminated.Eliminated outside of panel: Linda BraunbergerBottom two: Luca Vanak & Mareike MüllerEliminated: Mareike MüllerFeatured photographer: Rasmus KaessmannSpecial guests: Jochen Schweizer, Katy Bähm & Rebecca Mir

 Episode 10: Berlin is calling! 
Original airdate: 

The week started with a video shoot. The girls each had to portray an different emotion with german comedian Otto Waalkes. Romy decided to quit the competition due to personal reasons. At elimination, nobody was eliminated.Quit: Romy WolfBooked for job: Ashley AmeganEliminated: None Special guests: Esther Perbandt & Otto Waalkes

 Episode 11: Art Edition 
Original airdate: 

The week started with a casting. Ana was booked for the job. On the next day, the girls had their next photo shoot. The girls posed as artistic butterflies in an abandoned ruin in front of brightly painted wooden walls. At elimination, Ashley and Larissa landed in the bottom two. In the end, Larissa was eliminated.Booked for job: Ana MartinovicBottom two: Ashley Amegan & Larissa OnacEliminated: Larissa OnacFeatured photographer: Kristian SchullerSpecial guests: Miss Fame

 Episode 12: Casting Edition 
Original airdate: 

This week started with an expression training with Thomas Hayo. This week the girls didn't have a photo or video shoot. The girls had the chance to attend many different casting. Alex, Dascha, Liliana and Soulin were booked for a job. At elimination, Elisa was eliminated.Booked for job: Alex-Mariah Peter, Dascha Carriero (2x), Liliana Maxwell & Soulin OmarEliminated: Elisa SchattenbergSpecial guests: Kilian Kerner & Thomas Hayo

 Episode 13: Nacktshooting 
Original airdate: 

This week started with a photoshoot. The girls had to pose nude. The girls had again the opportunity to attend many casting. Romina and Yasmin were booked for a job. At elimination, Ana, Dascha and Liliana landed in the bottom three. In the end, Ana was eliminated.Booked for job: Romina Palm & Yasmin BoulaghBottom three: Ana Martinovic, Dascha Carriero & Liliana MaxwellEliminated: Ana MartinovicFeatured photographer: Markus JansSpecial guests: Bill Kaulitz, Jacky Wruck, Jochen Schweizer & Tom Kaulitz

 Episode 14: It's Fashion Week 
Original airdate: 

This week the girls didn't have a photo or video shoot again. This week the girls attend to Berlin Fashion Week. Alex, Dascha, Liliana, Romina and Soulin  were booked for a job. At elimination, the girls walked in a cool and edgy fashion show with german female rapper Loredana. Ashley and Luca landed in the bottom two. In the end, Luca was eliminated.Booked for job: Alex-Mariah Peter, Dascha Carriero, Liliana Maxwell, Romina Palm & Soulin OmarBottom two: Ashley Amegan & Luca VanakEliminated: Luca VanakSpecial guests: Kilian Kerner, Loredana & Lena Gercke

 Episode 15: Boys Edition 
Original airdate: 

The week started with a dance lesson with dancers from the show Magic Mike Live. On the next day, the girls had their next big photoshoot. In a set made of pure ice, the top model contestants had to pose in the freezing cold with male models. At elimination, the girls float as angels on the catwalk and then performed with the dancers from the Magic Mike Live crew. In the end, Liliana was eliminated.Booked for job: Soulin OmarEliminated: Liliana MaxwellFeatured photographer: Max Montgomery Special guests: Magic Mike Live crew & Wolfgang Joop

 Episode 16: Halbfinale 
Original airdate: 

Only six girls are still in the running for the title of Germany's Next Top Model. This week, the girls had their most important photoshoot, the Harper's Bazaar cover-try. At elimination, the girls had their last fashion show before the final and the opportunity to express clearly why they belong in the final. In the end, Yasmin was eliminated plus Ashley decided to quit the competition - making Alex-Mariah, Dascha, Romina and Soulin the top four of the sixteenth season of Germany's Next Top Model 2021.Eliminated: Yasmin BoulaghQuit: Ashley AmeganFeatured photographer: Marcin TyszkaSpecial guests: Alessandra Ambrosio & Kerstin Schneider

 Episode 17: Das große Finale 
Original airdate: 

After an exciting time in the fashion world, the top four of the sixteenth season of Germany's Next Top Model face their last challenge. The girls first had to walk as superheroes. After that, Romina was eliminated. Then, the final three girls had to walk a second time, showcasing their vibrant and big personalities. After that, Soulin was eliminated. Next, the final two shot a music video live with Tokio Hotel and stand on stage with singer Zoe Wees. In the end, Alex-Mariah was declared the winner.Final four: Alex-Mariah Peter, Dascha Carriero, Romina Palm & Soulin OmarBottom two: Dascha Carriero & Romina PalmEliminated: Romina PalmFinal three: Alex-Mariah Peter, Dascha Carriero & Soulin OmarBottom two: Alex-Mariah Peter & Soulin OmarEliminated: Soulin OmarPersonality Award: Liliana MaxwellFinal two: Alex-Mariah Peter & Dascha Carriero Germany's Next Topmodel: Alex-Mariah PeterSpecial guests: Nikeata Thompson, Tokio Hotel, VIZE & Zoe Wees

 Summaries 

 The contestant withdrew from the competition
 The contestant was eliminated
 The contestant was eliminated outside of the judging panel
 The contestant was in danger of elimination
 The contestant won the competition

Photo shoot guideEpisode 2 photo shoot and video shoot: Promo shoot in groups + opening credits with Heidi KlumEpisode 3 photo shoot: Portraying ballet dancers in pairsEpisode 4 photo shoot: Posing as luxurious women in front of a hotel with dogsEpisode 5 photo shoot: Posing at the end of the runway in Christian Cowan gownsEpisode 6 photo shoot: SedcardEpisode 7 video shoot: 80's themed TV spotsEpisode 8 photo shoot: Posing in a large vertical rotating square in groups of fourEpisode 9 photo shoot: Posing as fairies at a height of 122 metersEpisode 10 video shoot: Portraying emotions with Otto WaalkesEpisode 11 photo shoot: Posing as artistic butterflies in an abandoned ruinEpisode 13 photo shoot: Posing nude Episode 15 photo shoot: Posing as ice queens with the Magic Mike CrewEpisode 16 photo shoot: Harper's Bazaar cover-tryEpisode 17 music video:''' Behind Blue Eyes by Tokio Hotel & VIZE

 Controversies and criticism 

Throughout the season, six contestants quit the competition, breaking the record for most voluntary exits in the history of Germany's Next Topmodel''. Most of them stated that during filming, they were feeling mentally and physically exhausted.

Contestant Ashley Amegan stated that the production team had bullied her into changing her personality for the show. That's why she left the show even though she made it to the live finale.

In February 2023 Der Spiegel (online) gives a glimpse into the notorious gag contracts that candidates have to sign in order to be able to take part in the Heidi Klum show. According to the Hamburg lawyer Jörg Nabert, these are "illegal gag contracts". The contract binds the women to an agency for two years. A regulation that, according to Nabert, is not customary in the industry. The participants also agree that the recordings "present them in a way that they don't like themselves". According to Der Spiegel (online), the contracts say: "The contributors are aware of any burdens that may result for them". If necessary, “substantive suggestions” would be made and enforced by the show management. Germany's Next Topmodel can thus stylize people like Tessa Bergmeier (Season 4) as "bitches" without them being able to defend themselves effectively afterwards. Heidi Klum's casting show goes further than similar formats with this practice.

In February 2023, the Berliner Zeitung published an article about the show with the headline: "Why isn't Germany’s Next Topmodel actually canceled?" 

In February 2023, the German InTouch wrote: "The willingness to use violence among girls is increasing. They form gangs, bully, hit. Heidi is also partly responsible for the fact that, at least on TV, such behavior should not lead to extra airtime..." The article goes on to say: "With Germany’s Next Topmodel absolutely wrong values ​​​​are conveyed. It gives the impression that bullying is a legitimate means of dealing with each other."

In February 2023, the former judge Peyman Armin criticized the show and Heidi Klum as well. He said: "It has become a pure self-portrayal by Heidi. Heidi comes first. Then Heidi and Heidi again. When Heidi Klum is in the foreground and takes care of the slapstick, for sensational shootings and catfights." Part of the episodes are therefore always scenes in which Heidi Klum would blaspheme with jurors about the contestants.

Also in February 2023, former judge Wolfgang Joop criticized the show and Heidi Klum again when he said he had no say in the decisions. "Heidi does that. Nobody can help there." Not even the producers were allowed to have a say, apart from the timing of the direction. Joop: "Then they say something like: 'Don't let her go yet, the boyfriend will come, that'll bring a lot of tears of joy, we'll take that with us.'" He added: "I wouldn't have been surprised if the show had been discontinued." Web.de headlined: "Why Heidi Klum's statement is dishonest". Annabelle (magazine) (Switzerland) headlined: "Heidi Klum, this justification went wrong". In an article, Puls24 (Austria) asked whether Heidi Klum practiced perpetrator-victim reversal and Gaslighting. Frankfurter Allgemeine headlined: "This woman only has dollar signs in her eyes" and also assumed that Heidi Klum was doing a perpetrator-victim reversal. BILD asked: "How evil is Heidi Klum really?".

In March 2023 former judge Peyman Armin apologized to Lijana Kaggwa for what she had to experience on Germany's Next Topmodel. He also apologized for being part of Germany's Next Topmodel and promised to never take part in the show again. All of this was broadcast in the format "13 questions" on ZDF.

References

External links 
Official Website

2021 German television seasons
Germany's Next Topmodel
Television series impacted by the COVID-19 pandemic
Television shows filmed in Germany